Open access to scholarly communication in Hungary has developed in recent years through digital repositories and academic publishers, among other means. In 2008 several academic libraries founded the Hungarian Open Access Repositories (HUNOR) consortium.

Repositories 
There are a number of collections of scholarship in Hungary housed in digital open access repositories. They contain journal articles, book chapters, data, and other research outputs that are free to read.

See also
 Internet in Hungary
 Education in Hungary
 Media of Hungary
 Science and technology in Hungary
 Open access in other countries

References

Further reading

External links
 
 
 
 
 
 

Academia in Hungary
Communications in Hungary
Hungary
Publishing in Hungary
Science and technology in Hungary